David Slesser McCall CBE (born 3 December 1934) is a Scottish businessman and former broadcasting executive. He was Chief Executive of Anglia Television in Norwich throughout the 1980s and most of the 1990s.

Career
From 1959-61 he did his National Service.

Anglia Television
He joined Anglia Television Limited in Norwich in 1968, becoming Chief Executive in 1976. From 1986-94 he was also Chief Executive of Anglia Television Group, and Chairman from 1994-98. He retired as Chairman of Anglia Television in May 2001.

He became a Fellow of the Royal Television Society in 1988. He is a former president of the (CTBF).

Channel 4
In the early 1980s he helped to establish Channel 4.

Personal life
In the 1988 New Year Honours, he was appointed a CBE. He married Lois Elder in 1968.  He lives in Redenhall in South Norfolk, on the Suffolk boundary (River Waveney), off the A143.

References

External links
 East Anglian Film Archive biography (Arts and Humanities Research Council)

1934 births
Channel 4 people
Commanders of the Order of the British Empire
Fellows of the Royal Television Society
ITV people
Mass media in Norfolk
People associated with the University of East Anglia
People from Aberdeen
People from Redenhall with Harleston
Scottish television executives
Living people